Banyan Drive is a tree-lined street at the shoreline of Hilo, Hawaii. It is known as the "Hilo Walk of Fame" for the banyan trees planted by celebrities. These trees have withstood several tsunamis that have devastated the town on the Big Island of Hawaii.

History

The drive circles the Waiakea Peninsula, near Hilo International Airport, and boasts the largest hotels on the eastern side of the Big Island. It is located in Liliuokalani Gardens, and a small footbridge leads to Moku Ola, also known as Coconut Island.

Celebrity planting
In 1933, several park commissioners decided that it would be a good idea to have celebrities plant banyan tree saplings along the peninsula. In 1934, with the arrival of President Franklin Roosevelt in Hilo, it was decided to build a drive through the trees, then only of crushed coral. At the time, the peninsula hosted the Hilo Yacht club and several homes. In late 1933, Cecil B. DeMille was on the island filming "Four Frightened People". Several of the actors along with Mr. and Mrs. DeMille, all planted trees in their own honor. According to records, 8 trees were planted in October 1933. In addition to the movie stars, one tree was also planted by the famous baseballer, George Herman "Babe" Ruth.

Planting of trees by celebrities continued with an additional 10 trees planted in 1934, 15 in 1935, 6 in 1936, 5 in 1937, 4 in 1938. Two trees were planted in 1941, one in 1952 by Senator Richard Nixon, and two in 1972 by Pat Nixon, one to replace the tree planted by her husband which was lost in a storm and the other to honor her as first lady. In 1991 Polly Mooney replanted a tree lost to a tsunami honoring Civitan International leader Courtney Shropshire. Mrs. Mooney was also honored by being the first woman president of the previously male-dominated Civitan. The tree bears both their names.

Banyan Drive today 

Some of the trees were lost due to the effects of tsunamis that once devastated the Hilo coastline. Fifty trees still line Banyan Drive, marked with wooden plaques. Several of the banyan trees in the adjoining golf course may have been planted by honorees.

Most of the trees still thrive along Banyan Drive, having grown into a thick canopy, making it popular for walking. The trees, which still bear the names of the planters, 
honor movie stars, religious leaders, political leaders, famous authors, adventurers and local Hawaiians.

Development on Banyan Drive 
Banyan Drive is home to several hotels, apartment/condominium buildings, restaurants, and retail buildings.  Hotels include:

 The Hilo Hawaiian Hotel.
 The Grand Naniloa Hotel.
 The Hilo Seaside Hotel.
 The Hilo Reeds Bay Hotel.

Restaurants include:

 Hilo Bay Cafe.
 Coconut Grill.
 Ponds Restaurant.
 Suisan Fish Market.

Some hotels and apartment buildings have recently faced financial problems and closures.

The Banyan Drive Redevelopment Agency has proposed new parks, a new cruise ship port, new commercial activity, and a new hotel.  A bike trail connecting Banyan Drive to downtown Hilo has been built. Funds at the state and county level are being sought for redevelopment.

Gallery

Planters

Movie stars 

Movie stars (and directors) include Cecil B. DeMille and his wife Constance, Mary Boland, William Gargan, Edna Best, Herbert Marshall, and Leo Carrillo.

Adventurers 

Adventurers who planted trees include pilots Amelia Earhart, Knefler McGinnis and Arctic and Antarctic explorer, Lincoln Ellsworth.

Religious leaders 

Religious leaders were also honored by planting banyans in Hilo. These include then president of the Church of Jesus Christ of Latter-day Saints, Heber J. Grant, and Dr. John Sonnenberg, Pacific area president, Roman Catholic Bishop Stephen Alencastre, Monshu of the Hongwanji Buddhists Kosho Ohtani, Methodist leader Bishop Gerald Kennedy who planted a tree along the drive but it was not a banyan tree, Japanese Christian reformer Toyohiko Kagawa, YMCA Training School President Dr. L. L. Doggett, and Dr. Daniel A. Poling, once pastor of the Marble Collegiate Church.

Politicians 

Politicians that planted banyans include Franklin D. Roosevelt, Richard Nixon, Treasury Secretary Henry Morgenthau, War Secretary George Dern, Postmaster James Farley, National Guard Chief George Leach, Hawaii County Chairman Helene Hale, Hawaii County Chairman Samuel M. Spencer, Secretary of the Interior Oscar Chapman, and Hawaii Territorial Governor Oren Long.

Notable Hawaiians 

Hawaiians were often honored on Arbor Day, celebrated in Hawaii on the first Friday of November. Residents of the Territory and later State of Hawai'i include Virginio A. Carvalho, Otto Rose, vulcanologist Dr. Thomas Jaggar, Hawaiian Princess Abigail Kawānanakoa, James McCandless, Dr. Grover Batten, David McHattie Forbes, Benjamin Bond (son of Hawaiian Missionary Elias Bond), hotelier William Kimi, and hotelier George Lycurgus. Father "Louis" Aloysius Borghouts founded the Father Louis Boys' Home for orphans and ran it for 36 years.

Other honorees 

Other people honored by banyan tree planting include musician Louis "Satchmo" Armstrong, radio celebrity Arthur Godfrey, First Lady Pat Nixon, Supreme Court Justice Earl Warren, Eastern Star's William A. Duvall, Sr., American Legion's Ada Mucklestone and Ray Murphy, author Lewis Browne, Civitan's Courtney Shropshire and Polly Mooney Forestier, Philippine labor and cult leader Hilario Moncado, Boy Scout Executive James West, Cleveland College sociologist Henry Busch, authors Vicki Baum and Fannie Hurst, China's Premier Sun Fo, author and illustrator Hendrik Willem van Loon, Professor of Chinese culture P. C. Chang and cruise director of the RMS Franconia, Ross Hunt Skinner.

Trees planted in honor of others 

Some of the banyan trees were planted in honor of other people. This list includes King George V in honor of his silver jubilee, Hawaiian Park Ranger Albert MacKenzie by his wife on Arbor Day, Girl Scout founder, Juliette Low, by a local Girl Scout troop. Trees were also planted honoring the new Commonwealth of the Philippines by Rev. Yadao and the Shriners.

References
 

Transportation in Hawaii County, Hawaii
Roads in Hawaii
Hilo, Hawaii